George Nicholas Sanders (February 22, 1812 – August 13, 1873) was a former official of the United States who was believed by some to have a level of involvement in the assassination of Abraham Lincoln. Sanders was born in Lexington, Kentucky. His father was Lewis Sanders, and his mother was Ann Nicholas.

Early career
During his early career he was involved in breeding cattle and race horses. Sanders later moved to New York and married Anna Reid in 1836.  His father-in-law was Samuel Chester Reid.  He was involved in the Young America Movement and was an editor for the "Democratic Review."

Revolutionary ideas and causes
Sanders was a supporter of President James K. Polk and was later awarded the position of Consul in London during the administration of Franklin Pierce. He became involved in what, at the time, were regarded as revolutionary and anarchist causes and needed to be recalled. He had supposedly been involved in plans to assassinate heads of state, including French Emperor Napoleon III, or foment causes to bring about democratic reform. During the Civil War, he was involved in activities in Montreal that were supposed to support the Confederacy by unorthodox means. He had also made several trips to Europe to further the cause of the Southern States.

Lincoln assassination
In his book Murdering Mr. Lincoln, author Charles Higham asserts that Sanders was involved in the assassination, and was the driving force behind it. He argues that Sanders saw Lincoln had the potential of becoming a dictator. Lincoln had done things that violated the U.S. Constitution during the War. His book alleges that in June 1864, Sanders was in Montreal, Canada, Sanders was plotting against Lincoln with the Confederate Secret Service. Higham asserts that when John Wilkes Booth, Lincoln's assassin, arrived in Montreal in October 1864, he fell under the influence of Sanders and arranged Lincoln's assassination there. In 1864, General Ulysses S. Grant suspended trade with the Confederate Army, which Lincoln had allowed a limited amount. Higham surmounts that this removed any hesitation on Sanders' part on removing Lincoln.

Later life
After the assassination of Lincoln, attempts were made to take Sanders into custody, but he fled to Canada and Europe. In 1870, he was in Paris, where he attempted to aid the city's defenders during the Prussian siege:
Mr. George Sanders, whilom United States Consul in London, and one of the leaders of the ex-Confederacy, is here; he is preparing plans for a system of rifle pits and zigzags outside the fortifications, at the request of General Trochu. Mr. Sanders, who took an active part in the defence of Richmond, declares that Paris is impregnable, if it be only well defended. He complains, however, that the French will not use the spade.He later returned to the United States soon before he died in 1873 in New York. He is buried in an unmarked grave in Greenwood Cemetery in Brooklyn, New York.

References

1812 births
1873 deaths
Burials at Green-Wood Cemetery
People of New York (state) in the American Civil War
People associated with the assassination of Abraham Lincoln